St John the Baptist's is an ancient parish church in the centre of the town of Aberdare, Wales.

History
The original parish church was built in 1189. Some of its original architecture is still intact.

John Wesley preached on two occasions at St John's in 1749.

By the first half of the nineteenth century, St Johns's could only accommodate 250 people although the parish of Aberdare had a population of 13,000.   The condition of the church was said to be poor, and one commentator stated that the parishioners worshipped their maker in darkness. By 1853, the burial ground was full and the vicar, John Griffith, reported that until the ground was drained last year there was so much water in the soil that the coffins were often floating in it. The drainage now is not very complete. It took Griffith ten years to instigate the restoration of the church at a cost of £900, and it only became suitable for regular worship once again shortly before his departure to be rector of Merthyr Tydfil.  In the meantime, Griffith had instigated the building of St Elvan's Church, commonly known as the Cathedral of the Valleys, within sight of the older building.

The building is Grade II* listed.

References

Sources

Books and Journals

Online

Aberdare
Aberdare
Grade II* listed churches in Rhondda Cynon Taf